Qudama or Qudamah can refer to:

 Qudama ibn Ja'far (ca. 873 – ca. 932/948), Arab scholar and administrator
 Imam Samudra (1970 – 2008), an Indonesian convicted and executed form the 2002 Bali bombing

See also 
 Ibn Qudamah